Operator is a play by David Williamson. Williamson's son Rory played the lead role during its original production.

References

Plays by David Williamson
2005 plays